Vladislav Vatslavovich Dvorzhetsky (26 April 1939 – 28 May 1978) was a Soviet film actor. He appeared in eighteen films between 1970 and 1978.

Dvorzhetsky was born in Omsk. In 1955 he entered the Omsk military medical school. In 1959 he started active service in the Soviet Army at Sakhalin Island as senior feldsher of the regiment. During this time he married the first time.

In 1964 he went back to Omsk and entered the actors' school of Omsk. After graduation in 1967, Vladislav was accepted in the company of the Omsk provincial dramatic theatre. Here he married for the second time. In 1968 the assistant director from film-studio Mosfilm visits Omsk and Dvorzhetsky got his first role in a film as General Khludow in The Flight (1970). In his next film he was the test pilot Burton in the Solaris (1972). Both films competed In Competition at the Cannes Film Festival.

During the time in Moscow he divorced his second wife and he decided to live for his film-career. In spring 1972 he played the role of Alexander Ilyin in Sannikow-Land. In 1974 he played the communist Yaroslav in To the Last Minute and got the State prize of the Ukrainian SSR.

In 1975 he played the main role in the adventure film Captain Nemo based on the Jules Verne novel.

Dvorzhetsky died in 1978 in Gomel, due to acute heart failure.

Filmography

Dubbing
 Goya or the Hard Way to Enlightenment (1971)
 Nasimi (1973)

References

External links

 Biography

1939 births
1978 deaths
Actors from Omsk
Soviet male film actors
Recipients of the Shevchenko National Prize
Burials at Kuntsevo Cemetery